The National Institute of Statistics and Geography (INEGI by its name in  ) is an autonomous agency of the Mexican Government dedicated to coordinate the National System of Statistical and Geographical Information of the country. It was created on January 25, 1983, by presidential decree of Miguel de la Madrid.

It is the institution responsible for conducting the Censo General de Población y Vivienda every ten years; as well as the economic census every five years and the agricultural, livestock and forestry census of the country. The job of gathering statistical information of the Institute includes the monthly gross domestic product, consumer trust surveys and proportion of commercial samples; employment and occupation statistics, domestic and couple violence; as well as many other jobs that are the basis of studies and projections to other governmental institutions.

The Institute headquarters are in Aguascalientes City, in Aguascalientes, Mexico.

Functions 

With the enactment of the National System of Statistical and Geographical Information Law, (LSNIEG by its name in Spanish,  Ley del Sistema Nacional de Información Estadística y Geográfica) on April 16, 2008, INEGI changed its legal personality, acquiring technical and management autonomy. Its new denomination is National Institute of Statistic and Geography (INEGI by its name in Spanish, Instituto Nacional de Estadística y Geografía), but it preserves the acronym of its former name (INEGI).

INEGI's main objective is to achieve that the National System of Statistical and Geographical Information (SNIEG, by its name in Spanish), bring to the society and to the government, quality information, pertinent, truthful and relevant, to contribute to the national development, under accessibility, transparency, objectivity and independence principles.

To this goal, its attributions are:

 Regulate and coordinate the SNIEG's development.
 Regulate the statistical and geographical activities.
 Produce statistical and geographical information.
 Provide the Public Service of Information.
 Promote the knowledge and use of the information.
 Maintain information up to date.

The INEGI is governed by a government board, which oversees its operations. It is integrated by the institute president, and four vice presidents, who are designated by the president of Mexico with Chamber of Senators approval.

INEGI collaborates with American and Canadian government scientists, along with the Commission for Environmental Cooperation, to produce the North American Environmental Atlas, which is used to depict and track environmental issues for a continental perspective.

See also 
 Sociedad Mexicana de Geografía y Estadística
 Survey of Occupation and Employment

References

External links 
 National Institute of Statistic and Geography official website (INEGI)
 Cuéntame – INEGI’s educational section
 National System of Statistical and Geographical Information (SNIEG)
 Digital Map of Mexico
 Interactive National Atlas of Mexico
 Orthophotos display
 Geoespatial information to damage assessment and reconstruction support: Stan and Wilma hurricanes

National Institute of Statistics and Geography
Government agencies established in 1983
Mexico